Dorcadion pseudarcivagum is a species of beetle in the family Cerambycidae. It was described by Stephan von Breuning in 1943. It is found in Turkey. It contains the variety Dorcadion pseudarcivagum var. brevidorsale.

References

pseudarcivagum
Beetles described in 1943